Erik Varden, O.C.S.O. (born 13 May 1974) is a Norwegian Catholic spiritual writer, Trappist monk, and bishop-prelate of the Territorial Prelature of Trondheim since 1 October 2019.

Early life and education
Varden was born in a non-practising Lutheran family in South Norway and grew up in the village of Degernes. His Christian life was inspired by Tadeusz Hoppe. After school education in his native country, he continued to study at the Atlantic College, Wales (until 1992) and then at Magdalene College, Cambridge (1992–1995) with Master of Arts degree. He obtained a doctorate from St John's College, Cambridge and Licentiate of Sacred Theology at the Pontifical Oriental Institute in Rome.

He officially joined the Catholic Church in June 1993. He joined Mount St Bernard Abbey, a Trappist monastery near Coalville in Leicestershire, England in 2002; he made a profession on 1 October 2004 and a solemn profession on 6 October 2007, and was ordained as priest on 16 July 2011, for this community by bishop Malcolm McMahon.

From 2011 to 2013 he was a professor of Syriac language, monastic history, and Christian anthropology at the Pontifical Atheneum of St. Anselm in Rome.

Monastic Leadership
Varden left teaching at St. Anselm in Rome and returned to his abbey in 2013 upon his appointment as superior administrator of the abbey. On 16 April 2015, he became the eleventh abbot of Mount St Bernard Abbey, following a further election, also becoming the first abbot to have been born outside Britain or Ireland to lead this abbey. He also is an author of books and articles in the field of Christian spirituality and monasticism. He is also a musician and studied Gregorian chant under Mary Berry, later co-founding the Chant Forum with Margaret Truran of Stanbrook Abbey.

In 2015, Varden was interviewed as part of a BBC Four documentary, 'Saints and Sinners: Britain's Millennium of Monasteries', by Janina Ramirez.

In 2019, Varden was featured in the critically acclaimed feature documentary 'Outside the city' (2019) by Nick Hamer, which was broadcast on BBC, and distributed by Verve Pictures. It won the 2022 Sandford St Martin Award and was nominated for an RTS Award for best documentary in the UK.

Episcopal Ministry Trondheim
On 1 October 2019, he was appointed by pope Francis as the prelate of the Territorial Prelature of Trondheim in his native Norway, which had been vacant for the previous ten years. The consecration of Varden was scheduled for 4 January 2020 but was postponed because of health issues.

He received episcopal consecration on 3 October 2020 in Nidaros Cathedral. He is the first native Norwegian Roman Catholic bishop in Trondheim in modern times: his five predecessors were all German.

See also

References

External links 

Bishop Varden's website
The Catholic Church in Norway Official Site
Bishop Varden at Catholic-Hierarchy
The Episcopal Ordination of Erik Varden

1974 births
Living people
People from Sarpsborg
People educated at Atlantic College
People educated at a United World College
Alumni of Magdalene College, Cambridge
Alumni of St John's College, Cambridge
Pontifical Oriental Institute alumni
Pontifical Atheneum of St. Anselm alumni
Academic staff of the Pontifical Atheneum of St. Anselm
21st-century Roman Catholic bishops in Norway
Converts to Roman Catholicism from Lutheranism
Trappist bishops
Norwegian Roman Catholic bishops
Bishops appointed by Pope Francis